Darja Jurlova (born 3 March 1992) is a former Estonian biathlete. She was born in Narva. She competed at the Biathlon World Championships 2011, 2012, 2013 and 2015. She competed at the 2014 Winter Olympics in Sochi, in sprint and individual.

References

External links
 

1992 births
Living people
Sportspeople from Narva
Biathletes at the 2014 Winter Olympics
Estonian female biathletes
Olympic biathletes of Estonia
Estonian people of Russian descent